Chinese Wall is the third solo album by American singer Philip Bailey, released on the Columbia Records label in October 1984. Chinese Wall has been certified gold in the US on March 11, 1985. The album reached number 22 and number 10 on the Billboard 200 and Top R&B/Hip-Hop Albums charts respectively and it was ranked as the 63rd most successful album of 1985 on the Billboard 200. In 1986, the album gave Bailey a Grammy Award nomination for Best R&B Vocal Performance, Male, while "Easy Lover", the duet with Phil Collins (who produced the album), earned a nomination for Best Pop Performance by a Duo or Group With Vocals.

Background
The album was produced by English musician Phil Collins, who also played drums and keyboards, and co-wrote and sang co-lead vocals on "Easy Lover".

Collins later said, "Bailey got a lot of flak for being produced by someone who is white. There was this paranoia that the album would not be played by black stations...The reason I was on the video for "Easy Lover" is that I knew it wouldn't be shown if it was just Phil Bailey."

Critical reception

Joe Brown of The Washington Post commented, "The spirit of Earth, Wind and Fire goes one step beyond on his second solo effort, guided masterfully by Phil Collins, who can't seem to make a misstep these days. Bailey's falsetto soars ethereally (and sometimes scrapes earthily) over Collins' glistening wall of exotic percussion and electronic textures".

With a 3 out of 5 stars rating, James Henke of Rolling Stone stated, "This is not as funky as Earth, Wind and Fire, but it's a hundred times more appealing." 

Writing for The Voice, music journalist Nelson George praised Chinese Wall, declaring it "the most solid album by a black male since Purple Rain". He described "the Phenix Horns' stratospheric horn chart...Collins drumming (this white boy is funky) and Arif Mardin's impeccable string charts", saying Bailey "singing breathier and deeper – projects his sensitivity in a more muscular baritone."

Gary Graff of the Detroit Free Press wrote "Earth, Wind & Fire singer Bailey makes a wise bet by enlisting Collins to produce and play on his album. Besides a strong duet, "Easy Lover," the performances lift the album's quality above some inconsistent songwriting."

Lou Papineau of The Boston Globe found that, "This is a likable, undemanding album of lively uptempo struts and warm ballads."

Track listing

Personnel 
 Philip Bailey – lead and backing vocals, percussion (10)
 Lesette Wilson – keyboards, acoustic piano solo (10)
 George Massenburg – synthesizer programming
 Godfrey Wang – synthesizer programming
 Daryl Stuermer – guitars, guitar solo (4, 6)
 Nathan East – bass guitar, bass pedals (4), kalimba (4), keyboards (5)
 Phil Collins – drums (1-9), vocoder (1), LinnDrum (1, 3, 5), Simmons (2, 8, 9), keyboards (3, 6), backing vocals (3, 6, 8), lead vocals (6), percussion (10)
 Paulinho da Costa – percussion (7, 10)
 The Phenix Horns – horns (3, 5, 7, 8, 9)
 Don Myrick – saxophones (3, 5, 7, 8, 9), sax solo (5)
Louis Satterfield – trombone (3, 5, 7, 8, 9)
 Michael Harris – trumpet (3, 5, 7, 8, 9), trumpet solo (9)
 Rahmlee Michael Davis – trumpet (3, 5, 7, 8, 9)
 Tom-Tom 84 – horn arrangements (3, 5, 7, 8, 9)
 Arif Mardin – string arrangements (5, 7, 9)
 Josie James – backing vocals (3, 4, 8)
 Carl Carwell – backing vocals (7, 10)
 Winston Ford – backing vocals (7, 10)
 Nigel Martinez – backing vocals (8)

Production 
 Producer – Phil Collins
 Engineer – George Massenburg
 Assistant Engineers – Steve Chase, Judy Clapp, Murray Dvorkin and Tom Perry.
 Art Direction and Design – Tony Lane and Nancy Donald
 Cover Photography – Ellen Land-Weber and Randee St. Nicholas 
 Management – Cavallo, Ruffalo and Fargnoli Management.

Charts and certifications

Weekly charts

Year-end  charts

Certifications

Singles

References

External links
Chinese Wall at Discogs

1984 albums
Philip Bailey albums
Albums arranged by Arif Mardin
Albums produced by Phil Collins
Columbia Records albums